"Kenneth" Ma Hon Wah (born 24 March 1960) is a Hong Kong racing driver currently competing in the TCR Asia Series. Having previously competed in the Clio Cup China Series and Asian Formula Renault Series among others.

Racing career
Ma began his career in 2000 in the Formula 2000 Asia, finishing the season 7th in the standings. He was switched to the Asian Formula Renault Series in 2004, racing in the series for many years before switching to the Asian GT Championship in 2008. In 2009, he was switched to the Clio Cup China Series, finishing 2nd in the standings in 2014. In 2012, he raced in the Malaysia Super Series. He raced in the Renault Clio Cup Bohemia and Renault Clio Eurocup in 2013 and 2014, respectively. In 2014 he also raced in the CTM Macau Cup.

In September 2015, it was announced that he would raced in the inaugural TCR Asia Series round in Sepang, driving a Ford Focus ST for FRD HK Racing. However, due to parts arriving late, he didn't start any of the races.

Racing record

Complete TCR International Series results
(key) (Races in bold indicate pole position) (Races in italics indicate fastest lap)

† Driver did not finish the race, but was classified as he completed over 90% of the race distance.

References

External links
 

1960 births
Living people
Asian Formula Renault Challenge drivers
TCR Asia Series drivers
TCR International Series drivers
Hong Kong racing drivers
24H Series drivers
KCMG drivers